José Alexis Valido Moreno (born March 9, 1976) is a Spanish volleyball player who represented his native country at the 2000 Summer Olympics in Sydney, Australia. There he finished ninth place with the Men's National Team.

References
 Sydney2000 - Spanish Olympic Committee

External links
 
 
 

1976 births
Living people
Spanish men's volleyball players
Olympic volleyball players of Spain
Volleyball players at the 2000 Summer Olympics
Mediterranean Games medalists in volleyball
Mediterranean Games silver medalists for Spain
Competitors at the 2009 Mediterranean Games
Sportspeople from Las Palmas